The British Aircraft Corporation TSR-2 is a cancelled Cold War  strike and reconnaissance aircraft developed by the British Aircraft Corporation (BAC), for the Royal Air Force (RAF) in the late 1950s and early 1960s. The TSR-2 was designed around both conventional and nuclear weapons delivery: it was to penetrate well-defended frontline areas at low altitudes and very high speeds, and then attack high-value targets in rear areas. Another intended combat role was to provide high-altitude, high-speed stand-off, side-looking radar and photographic imagery and signals intelligence, aerial reconnaissance. Only one airframe flew and test flights and weight-rise during design indicated that the aircraft would be unable to meet its original stringent design specifications. The design specifications were reduced as the result of flight testing.

The TSR-2 was the victim of ever-rising costs and inter-service squabbling over Britain's future defence needs, which together led to the controversial decision in 1965 to scrap the programme.  It was decided to order an adapted version of the General Dynamics F-111 instead, but that decision was later rescinded as costs and development times increased. The replacements included the Blackburn Buccaneer and McDonnell Douglas F-4 Phantom II, both of which had previously been considered and rejected early in the TSR-2 procurement process. Eventually, the smaller swing-wing Panavia Tornado was developed and adopted by a European consortium to fulfil broadly similar requirements to the TSR-2.

Development

Operational environment

The introduction of the first jet engines in the late-World War II period led to calls for new jet-powered versions of practically every aircraft then flying. Among these was the design of a replacement for the de Havilland Mosquito, at that time among the world's leading medium bombers. The Mosquito had been designed with the express intent of reducing the weight of the aircraft in order to improve its speed as much as possible. This process led to the removal of all defensive armament, improving performance to the point where it was unnecessary anyway. This high-speed approach was extremely successful, and a jet-powered version would be even more difficult to intercept.

This led to Air Ministry specification E.3/45. The winning design, the English Electric Canberra, also dispensed with defensive armament, producing a design with the speed and altitude that allowed it to fly past most defences. The design's large wings gave it the lift needed to operate at very high altitudes, placing it above the range where even jet powered fighters were able to intercept it. The Canberra could simply fly over its enemy with relative impunity, a quality that made it naturally suited to aerial reconnaissance missions. The design was so successful that it was licensed for production in the United States, one of very few such cases. The Martin RB-57D and RB-57F American-built reconnaissance subtypes further extended the wings up to a  span for extremely high altitude capabilities.

This high-speed, high-altitude approach was effective until the late 1950s, when the Soviet Union began to introduce its first surface-to-air missiles (SAMs). SAMs had speed and altitude performance much greater than any contemporary aircraft. The Canberra, and other high-altitude aircraft like the British V bombers or United States' Boeing B-52 Stratofortress, were extremely vulnerable to these weapons. The first aircraft to fall victim to the Soviet S-75 Dvina (NATO name "SA-2 Guideline") SAM was a Taiwanese RB-57, a US reconnaissance version of the Canberra, shot down in 1959.

The solution was to fly lower: since radar operates in line-of-sight, the curvature of the Earth renders low-flying aircraft invisible beyond a certain range, the radar horizon. In practice, trees, hills, valleys and any other obstructions reduce this range even more, making a ground-based interception extremely difficult. The Canberra was designed for medium- to high-altitude flight and was not suitable for continuous terrain-hugging flight; this would require a completely different aircraft. Low-level strike aircraft, or "interdictors", grew into a new class of their own during the late 1950s. They generally featured high wing loading to reduce the effects of turbulence and cross-wind, some form of high-performance navigational radar to allow very low flight at high speeds, and large fuel loads to offset the higher fuel use at low altitudes.

GOR.339

Aware of the changing operational environment, the Ministry of Supply started work with English Electric in 1955, attempting to define a new light bomber to replace the Canberra. These early studies eventually settled on an aircraft with a  ferry range, Mach 1.5 speed "at altitude" and  low-level range. A crew of two was required, one being the operator of the advanced navigational and attack equipment. The bombload was to be four  bombs.

The requirements were eventually made official in November 1956 with General Operational Requirement 339 (GOR.339), which was issued to various aircraft manufacturers in March 1957. This requirement was exceptionally ambitious for the technology of the day, requiring a supersonic all-weather aircraft that could deliver nuclear weapons over a long range, operate at high level at Mach 2+ or low level at Mach 1.2, with STOL or possible VTOL performance. The latter requirement was a side-effect of common battle plans from the 1950s, which suggested that nuclear strikes in the opening stages of war would damage most runways and airfields, meaning that aircraft would need to take off from "rough fields" such as disused Second World War airfields, or even sufficiently flat and open areas of land.

Specifically, the requirement included:
 Delivery of tactical nuclear weapons at low level in all weathers, by day and night
 Photo-reconnaissance at medium level (day) and low level (day and night)
 Electronic reconnaissance in all weathers
 Delivery of tactical nuclear weapons day and night at medium altitudes using blind bombing if necessary
 Delivery of conventional bombs and rockets

Low level was stated to be under  with an expected attack speed at sea level of Mach 0.95.

Political changes

As this specification was being studied by various manufacturers, the first of the political storms that were to dog the project reared its head, when Defence Minister Duncan Sandys stated in the 1957 Defence White Paper that the era of manned combat was at an end and ballistic missiles were the weapons of the future. This viewpoint was vigorously debated by the aviation industry and within the Ministry of Defence for years. Senior RAF officers argued against the White Paper's premise, stating the importance of mobility, and that the TSR-2 could not only replace the Canberra, but potentially the entire V bomber force.

In addition to the argument over the need for manned aircraft, additional political machinations had the effect of complicating the project. In September 1957 the Ministry of Supply informed the heads of the aviation companies that the only acceptable proposals would be those issued from teams consisting of more than one company. There was a large number of competing aircraft manufacturing companies in the UK, while orders were decreasing; thus the government intended to foster cooperation between certain companies and encourage mergers.

Another political matter, that did not help, was the mutual distrust between the various services. At the time that GOR.339 was being defined, the Royal Navy was in the midst of its NA.39 project, which would eventually become the Blackburn Buccaneer. This was a low-altitude subsonic attack aircraft, designed for over-water as opposed to overland use. The savings involved in both forces using a common aircraft would be considerable, and Blackburn offered the RAF a version of the NA.39 to fit some of the GOR.339 requirements. The Chief of  the Defence Staff, and former First Sea Lord, Lord Mountbatten was a loyal proponent of the Buccaneer, later claiming that five of the type could be purchased for the same price as one TSR-2. However, the RAF rebuffed the proposal, stating that it was unsuitable due to poor takeoff performance and the avionics not being capable of the desired role. As one RAF official put it, "If we show the slightest interest in NA.39 we might not get the GOR.339 aircraft."

Another political opponent of the TSR-2 project was Sir Solly Zuckerman, at the time the Chief Scientific Advisor to the Ministry of Defence. Zuckerman had a low opinion of British technological achievements and was in favour of procuring military hardware from the United States.

Submissions

Work on GOR.339 continued, with a deadline for submissions on 31 January 1958.  Many proposals were entered; English Electric teamed up with Short Brothers and submitted its P.17A along with the Shorts' P.17D, a vertical-lift platform that would give the P.17 a VTOL capability; designs were also received from Avro, Blackburn (the NA.39), de Havilland, Fairey, Hawker and Vickers-Armstrongs. The Air Ministry eventually selected the EE P.17A and the Vickers-Armstrongs Type 571 for further consideration. The Ministry was particularly impressed with the Vickers submission, which included not only the aircraft design, but a "total systems concept" outlining all the avionics, support facilities and logistics needed to maintain the aircraft in the field. Official opinions of English Electric's management found it decidedly lacking in comparison to Vickers, but the combination of the two was felt by officialdom to be a useful marriage and accordingly the development contract was awarded to Vickers, with English Electric as sub-contractor.

The existence of GOR.339 was revealed to the public in December 1958 in a statement to the House of Commons. Under pressure by the recommendations of the Committee on Estimates, the Air Ministry examined ways that the various project proposals could be combined, and in January 1959 the Minister of Supply announced that the TSR-2 would be built by Vickers-Armstrongs working with English Electric; the initials coming from "Tactical Strike and Reconnaissance, Mach 2", the 'Strike' part of the designation specifically referring in RAF terminology to a nuclear weapons role.

On 1 January 1959, the project was given an official go-ahead; in February, it came under the new designation Operational Requirement 343.

Mission

Of that mission  was to be flown at higher altitudes at Mach 1.7 and the  into and out of the target area was to be flown as low as 200 ft at a speed of Mach 0.95. The remainder of the mission was to be flown at Mach 0.92. Heavier weapons loads could be carried with further reductions in range. Plans for increasing the TSR-2's range included fitting external tanks: one  tank under each wing or one  tank carried centrally below the fuselage. If no internal weapons were carried, a further  could be carried in a tank in the weapons bay. Later variants would have been fitted with variable-geometry wings.

The TSR-2 was also to be equipped with a reconnaissance pack in the weapons bay which included an optical linescan unit built by EMI, three cameras and a sideways-looking radar (SLR) in order to carry out the majority of its reconnaissance tasks. Unlike modern linescan units that use infrared imaging, the TSR-2's linescan would use daylight imaging or an artificial light source to illuminate the ground for night reconnaissance.

Tactical nuclear weapons
Carriage of the existing Red Beard tactical nuclear bomb had been specified at the beginning of the TSR-2 project, but it was quickly realised that Red Beard was unsuited to external carriage at supersonic speeds, had safety and handling limitations, and its 15 kt yield was considered inadequate for the targets assigned. Instead, in 1959, a successor to Red Beard, an "Improved Kiloton Bomb" to a specification known as Operational Requirement 1177 (OR.1177), was specified for the TSR-2. In the tactical strike role, the TSR-2 was expected to attack targets beyond the forward edge of the battlefield assigned to the RAF by NATO, during day or night and in all weathers. These targets comprised missile sites, both hardened and soft, aircraft on airfields, runways, airfield buildings, airfield fuel installations and bomb stores, tank concentrations, ammunition and supply dumps, railways and railway tunnels, and bridges.

However, a ministerial ruling on 9 July 1962 decreed that all future tactical nuclear weapons should be limited to a yield of 10 kt. The RAF issued a new version of the OR.1177 specification, accepting the lower yield, while making provision in the design for it to be capable of adaptation later for a higher yield, in the event of the political restriction being lifted. Meanwhile, the RAF explored ways of compensating for the lower yield by including, in the specifications for both the bomb and TSR-2, provision for releasing the smaller weapons in salvos, dropping sticks of four of the revised OR.1177, later named WE.177A, at  intervals to prevent the detonation of the first weapon destroying the succeeding ones before they could, in turn, detonate. The requirement for stick bombing using nuclear weapons was soon dropped as larger yield bombs came back into favour.

A drawback of carrying WE.177 on external pylons was a limitation due to aerodynamic heating of the bomb's casing. WE.177A was limited to a maximum carriage time of five minutes at Mach 1.15 at low level on TSR-2, otherwise the bomb's temperature would rise above its permitted maximum. This would impose a severe operational restriction on TSR-2, as the aircraft was designed for Mach 1+ cruise at this height.

Nuclear stand-off missiles were also proposed for the TSR-2 early in development but not proceeded with. Conventional missiles were catered for instead, with the design originally centring on use of the AGM-12 Bullpup, then moving on to favour the French AS-30 before settling on the new OR.1168 missile (which would become the TV-guided AJ-168 Martel).

After the cancellation of the TSR-2, the RAF eventually filled the tactical strike requirement using McDonnell F-4 Phantom IIs with US dual-key nuclear weapons, but continued their attempts to get the 10 kt limit lifted. Development of WE.177A was delayed by several years due to the Atomic Weapons Research Establishment (AWRE) at Aldermaston being inundated with work on other warhead developments. AWRE workload eased after completion of the Polaris missile warheads and work was able to resume on the WE.177A, deliveries to the RAF beginning in late 1971 for deployment on Buccaneers of RAF Germany, a year after WE.177A deliveries to the Royal Navy. Approval for high-yield tactical weapons was eventually gained in 1970 and, by 1975, the RAF had WE.177C, which at almost 200 kt was a weapon very similar to what they had planned for the TSR-2 in 1959.

Design

Throughout 1959, English Electric (EE) and Vickers worked on combining the best of both designs in order to put forward a joint design with a view to having an aircraft flying by 1963, while also working on merging the companies under the umbrella of the British Aircraft Corporation. EE had put forward a delta winged design and Vickers, a swept wing on a long fuselage. The EE wing, born of their greater supersonic experience, was judged superior to Vickers, while the Vickers fuselage was preferred. In effect, the aircraft would be built 50/50: Vickers the front half, EE the rear.

The TSR-2 was to be powered by two Bristol-Siddeley Olympus reheated turbojets, advanced variants of those used in the Avro Vulcan. The Olympus would be further developed and would power the supersonic Concorde. The design featured a small shoulder-mounted delta wing with down-turned tips, an all-moving swept tailplane and a large all-moving fin. Blown flaps were fitted across the entire trailing edge of the wing to achieve the short takeoff and landing requirement, something that later designs would achieve with the technically more complex swing-wing approach. No ailerons were fitted, control in roll instead being implemented by differential movement of the slab tailplanes. The wing loading was high for its time, enabling the aircraft to fly at very high speed and low level with great stability without being constantly upset by thermals and other ground-related weather phenomena. The EE Chief Test Pilot, Wing Commander Roland Beamont, favourably compared the TSR-2's supersonic flying characteristics to the Canberra's own subsonic flight characteristics, stating that the Canberra was more troublesome.

The aircraft featured some extremely sophisticated avionics for navigation and mission delivery, which would also prove to be one of the reasons for the spiralling costs of the project. Some features, such as forward looking radar (FLR) and side-looking radar for navigational fixing, only became commonplace on military aircraft years later.  These features allowed for an innovative autopilot system which, in turn, enabled long distance terrain-following sorties as crew workload and pilot input had been greatly reduced.

There were considerable problems with realising the design. Some contributing manufacturers were employed directly by the Ministry rather than through BAC, leading to communication difficulties and further cost overruns. Equipment, an area in which BAC had autonomy, would be supplied by the Ministry from "associate contractors", although the equipment would be designed and provided by BAC, subject to ministry approval. The overall outlay of funds made it the largest aircraft project in Britain to date.

Unlike most previous projects, there were to be no prototypes. Under the "development batch" procedure pioneered by the Americans (and also used by English Electric for the Lightning), there would instead be a development batch of nine airframes, to be built using production jigs. The choice of proceeding to production tooling turned out to be another source of delay, with the first aircraft having to adhere to strict production standards or deal with the bureaucracy of attaining concessions to allow them to exhibit differences from later airframes. Four years into the project, the first few airframes had effectively become prototypes in all but name, exhibiting a succession of omissions from the specification and differences from the intended pre-production and production batches.

Operational history

Testing

Despite the increasing costs the first two of the development batch aircraft were completed. Engine development and undercarriage problems led to delays for the first flight which meant that the TSR-2 missed the opportunity to be displayed to the public at 1964's Farnborough Airshow. In the days leading up to the testing, Denis Healey, the Opposition shadow secretary for defence, had criticised the aircraft saying that by the time it was introduced it would face "new anti-aircraft" missiles that would shoot it down making it prohibitively expensive at £16 million per aircraft (on the basis of only 30 ordered).

Test pilot Roland Beamont finally made the first flight from the Aeroplane and Armament Experimental Establishment (A&AEE) at Boscombe Down, Wiltshire, on 27 September 1964. Shortly after takeoff on XR219's second flight, vibration from a fuel pump at the resonant frequency of the human eyeball caused the pilot to throttle back one engine to avoid momentary loss of vision.

Only on the 10th test flight was the landing gear successfully retracted—problems preventing this on previous occasions, but serious vibration problems on landing persisted throughout the flight testing programme. The first supersonic test flight (Flight 14) was achieved on the transfer from A&AEE, Boscombe Down, to BAC Warton. During the flight, the aircraft achieved Mach 1 on dry power only (supercruise). Following this, Beamont lit a single reheat unit as the other engine's reheat fuel pump was unserviceable, with the result that the aircraft accelerated away from the chase English Electric Lightning (a high speed interceptor) flown by Wing Commander James "Jimmy" Dell, who had to catch up using reheat on both engines. On flying the TSR-2 himself, Dell described the prototype as handling "like a big Lightning".

Over a period of six months, a total of 24 test flights were conducted. Most of the complex electronics were not fitted to the first aircraft, so these flights were all concerned with the basic flying qualities of the aircraft which, according to the test pilots involved, were outstanding. Speeds of Mach 1.12 and sustained low-level flights down to 200 ft were achieved above the Pennines. Undercarriage vibration problems continued, however, and only in the final few flights, when XR219 was fitted with additional tie-struts on the already complex landing gear, was there a significant reduction in them. The last test flight took place on 31 March 1965.

Although the test flying programme was not completed and the TSR-2 was undergoing typical design and systems modifications reflective of its sophisticated configuration, "[T]here was no doubt that the airframe would be capable of accomplishing the tasks set for it and that it represented a major advance on any other type."

Costs continued to rise, which led to concerns at both company and government upper management levels, and the aircraft was also falling short of many of the requirements laid out in OR.343, such as takeoff distance and combat radius.

Project cancellation

By the 1960s, the United States military was developing the swing-wing F-111 project as a follow-on to the Republic F-105 Thunderchief, a fast low-level fighter-bomber designed in the 1950s with an internal bay for a nuclear weapon. There had been some interest in the TSR-2 from Australia for the Royal Australian Air Force (RAAF), but in 1963, the RAAF chose to buy the F-111 instead, having been offered a better price and delivery schedule by the American manufacturer. Nonetheless, the RAAF had to wait 10 years before the F-111 was ready to enter service, by which time the anticipated programme cost had tripled. The RAF was also asked to consider the F-111 as an alternative cost-saving measure. In response to suggestions of cancellation, BAC employees held a protest march, and the new Labour government, which had come to power in 1964, issued strong denials. However, at two Cabinet meetings held on 1 April 1965, it was decided to cancel the TSR-2 on the grounds of projected cost, and instead to obtain an option agreement to acquire up to 110 F-111 aircraft with no immediate commitment to buy. This decision was announced in the budget speech of 6 April 1965. The maiden flight of the second development batch aircraft, XR220, was due on the day of the announcement, but following an accident in conveying the airframe to Boscombe Down, coupled with the announcement of the project cancellation, it never happened. Ultimately, only the first prototype, XR219, ever took to the air. A week later, the Chancellor defended the decision in a debate in the House of Commons, saying that the F-111 would prove cheaper.

All airframes were then ordered to be destroyed and burned.

Aeronautical engineer and designer of the Hawker Hurricane Sir Sydney Camm said of the TSR-2: "All modern aircraft have four dimensions: span, length, height and politics. TSR-2 simply got the first three right."

TSR-2 replacements
To replace the TSR-2, the Air Ministry initially placed an option for the F-111K (a modified F-111A with F-111C enhancements) but also considered two other choices: a Rolls-Royce Spey (RB.168 Spey 25R) conversion of a Dassault Mirage IV (the Dassault/BAC Spey-Mirage IV) and an enhanced Blackburn Buccaneer S.2 with a new nav-attack system and reconnaissance capability, referred to as the "Buccaneer 2-Double-Star". Neither proposal was pursued as a TSR-2 replacement although a final decision was reserved until the 1966 Defence Review. Defence Minister Healey's memo about the F-111 and the Cabinet minutes regarding the final cancellation of the TSR-2 indicate that the F-111 was preferred.

Following the 1966 Defence White Paper, the Air Ministry decided on two aircraft: the F-111K, with a longer-term replacement being a joint Anglo-French project for a variable geometry strike aircraft – the Anglo French Variable Geometry Aircraft (AFVG). A censure debate followed on 1 May 1967, in which Healey claimed the cost of the TSR-2 would have been £1,700 million over 15 years including running costs, compared with £1,000 million for the F-111K/AFVG combination. Although 10 F-111Ks were ordered in April 1966 with an additional order for 40 in April 1967, the F-111 programme suffered enormous cost escalation coupled with the devaluation of the pound, far exceeding that of the TSR-2 projection. Many technical problems were still unresolved before successful operational deployment and, faced with poorer-than-projected performance estimates, the order for 50 F-111Ks for the RAF was eventually cancelled in January 1968.

To provide a suitable alternative to the TSR-2, the RAF settled on a combination of the F-4 Phantom II and the Blackburn Buccaneer, some of which were transferred from the Royal Navy. These were the same aircraft that the RAF had derided in order to get the TSR-2 go-ahead, but the Buccaneer proved capable and remained in service until 1994. The RN and RAF versions of the Phantom II were given the designation F-4K and F-4M respectively, and entered service as the Phantom FG.1 (fighter/ground attack) and Phantom FGR.2 (fighter/ground attack/reconnaissance), remaining in service (in the air-to-air role) until 1992.

The RAF's Phantoms were replaced in the strike/reconnaissance role by the SEPECAT Jaguar in the mid-1970s. In the 1980s, both the Jaguar and Buccaneer were eventually replaced in this role by the variable-geometry Panavia Tornado, a much smaller design than either the F-111 or the TSR-2. Experience in the design and development of the avionics, particularly the terrain-following capabilities, were used on the later Tornado programme. In the late 1970s, as the Tornado was nearing full production, an aviation businessman, Christopher de Vere, initiated a highly speculative feasibility study into resurrecting and updating the TSR-2 project. However, despite persistent lobbying of the UK government of the time, his proposal was not taken seriously and came to nothing.

Survivors

The TSR-2 tooling, jigs and many of the part completed aircraft were all scrapped at Brooklands within six months of the cancellation. Two airframes eventually survived: the complete XR220 at the RAF Museum, Cosford, and the much less complete  XR222 at the Imperial War Museum Duxford. The only airframe ever to fly, XR219, along with the completed XR221 and part completed XR223 were taken to Shoeburyness and used as targets to test the vulnerability of a modern airframe and systems to gunfire and shrapnel. Four additional completed airframes, XR224, XR225, XR226 and one incomplete airframe XR227 (X-06,07,08 and 09) were scrapped by R. J. Coley and Son, Hounslow Middlesex. Four further airframe serials XR228 to XR231 were allocated but these aircraft were allegedly not built. Construction of a further 10 aircraft (X-10 to 19) allocated serials XS660 to 669 was started but all partly built airframes were again scrapped by R. J. Coley. The last serial of that batch, XS670 is listed as "cancelled", as are those of another batch of 50 projected aircraft, XS944 to 995.
By coincidence, the projected batch of 46 General Dynamics F-111Ks (of which the first four were the trainer variant TF-111K) were allocated RAF serials XV884-887 and 902–947, but these again were cancelled when the first two were still incomplete.

The haste with which the project was scrapped has been the source of much argument and bitterness since and is comparable to the cancellation and destruction of the American Northrop Flying Wing bombers, and the Avro Canada CF-105 Arrow interceptor that was scrapped in Canada in 1959.

Surviving airframes
XR220 (X-02) on display at RAF Museum Cosford
XR222 (X-04) on display at Imperial War Museum Duxford
 Cockpit section on display at Brooklands Museum 
 Bristol Siddeley Olympus 22R-320 – 2 engines on display at Gatwick Aviation Museum

Specifications

See also

References

Notes

Citations

Bibliography
 Barnett-Jones, Frank. "Oops!" Aeroplane, Volume 28, No.2, Issue 322, February 2000.
 Boot, Roy. From Spitfire to Eurofighter: 45 Years of Combat Aircraft Design. Shrewsbury, Shropshire, UK: Airlife Publishing Ltd., 1990. .
 "Boscombe Down, September 27, 1964: The TSR.2's First Flight (Pilot Roland Beamont; Navigator Donald Bowen)." Flight, October 1964, pp. 637–640.
 Burke, Damien. TSR2: Britain's Lost Bomber. Ramsbury, Marlborough, Wiltshire, UK: The Crowood Press, 2010. .
 Buttler, Tony. British Secret Projects: Jet Bombers Since 1949. Earl Shilton, Leicester, UK: Midland Publishing, 2003. .
 Buttler, Tony. "Strike Rivals: The ones that 'lost' when the T.S.R.2 'won'." Air Enthusiast, No. 59, September/October 1995.
 Buttler, Tony. X-Planes of Europe II: Military Prototype Aircraft from the Golden Age 1946–1974. Manchester, UK: Hikoki Publications, 2015. 
 Campagna, Palmiro. Storms of Controversy: The Secret Avro Arrow Files Revealed.  Toronto: Stoddart, Third paperback edition, 1998. .
 Donald, David, ed. "BAC TSR.2". The Complete Encyclopedia of World Aircraft. New York: Barnes & Noble Books, 1997. .
 Donald, David. "RAF Phantoms". Wings of Fame. London: Aerospace. Volume 15, 1999. pp. 4–21. .
 Franklin, Roger. The Defender: The Story of General Dynamics. New York: Harper & Row, 1986. .
 Hunter, Air Vice-Marshal A.F.C., CBE AFC DL, ed. "TSR2 with Hindsight." London: RAF Historical Journal, Issue 17B, 1998. .
 Jefford, C. G. RAF Squadrons, a Comprehensive Record of the Movement and Equipment of all RAF Squadrons and their Antecedents since 1912. Shrewsbury, Shropshire, UK: Airlife Publishing, 2001. .
 Jenkins, Dennis R. B-1 Lancer: The Most Complicated Warplane Ever Developed. New York: McGraw-Hill, 1999. .
 Forbat, John. TSR2: Precision Attack to Tornado. Stroud, UK: Tempus Publishing Ltd., 2006. .
 Gardner, Charles. British Aircraft Corporation: A History by Charles Gardner. London: B.T. Batsford Limited, 1981. .
 Gardner, Richard E. The F-4 Phantom II. Edware, Middlesex, UK: Almarks Publishing Co., 1970. No ISBN.
 Gardner, Robert. From Bouncing Bombs to Concorde: The Authorised Biography of Aviation Pioneer Sir George Edwards OM. Stroud, Gloustershire, UK: Sutton Publishing, 2006. .
 Garver, John W. Face Off: China, the United States and Taiwan's Democratization. Seattle, Washington: University of Washington Press, 1997. .
 Gunston, Bill. F-111 (Modern Combat Aircraft). New York: Charles Scribner's Sons, 1978. .
 Hamilton-Paterson, James. Empire of the Clouds: When Britain's Aircraft Ruled the World. London: Faber & Faber, 2010. .
 Hastings, Stephen. The Murder of TSR-2. London: Macdonald & Co., 1966.
 Harver, John W. The Sino-American Alliance: Nationalist China and American Cold War Strategy in Asia. Armonk, New York: M.E. Sharpe, 1997. .
 Kaldor, Mary, Dan Smith and Steve Vines. Democratic Socialism and The Cost of Defence: The Report and Papers of The Labour Party Defence Study Group. London: Routledge, 1979. .
 Law, John. Aircraft Stories: Decentering The Object in Technoscience. Durham, North Carolina: Duke University Press, 2002. .
.
 Logan, Don. General Dynamics F-111 Aardvark. Atglen, Pennsylvania: Schiffer Military History, 1998. .
 Lucas, Paul. BAC TSR.2: Lost Tomorrows of an Eagle, The TSR.2 which Might Have Been 1960–1980. Bedford, UK: SAM Publications, 2009. .
 McLelland, Tim. TSR.2: Britain's Lost Cold War Strike Aircraft. Hinckley, Leicestershire, UK: Classic Publications, 2010. .
 Segell, Glen. Royal Air Force Procurement: The TSR.2 to the Tornado. Staffordshire, UK: Glen Segell Publishers, 1998. .
 Segell, Glen. Wither or Dither: British Aerospace Collaborative Procurement with Europe. Staffordshire, UK: Glen Segell Publishers, 1997. .
 Smith, Dan. The Defence of The Realm in The 1980s. London: Taylor & Francis, 1980. .
 Sweetman, Bill. Phantom (Jane's Aircraft Spectacular Series). London: Jane's Information Group, 1984. .
 Taylor, John W.R. "The BAC TSR-2." Air Pictorial, Volume 25, No. 12, December 1963.
 Thornborough, Anthony. TSR2 (Aeroguide Special). Suffolk, UK: Ad Hoc Publications, 2005. .
 Winchester, Jim. "BAC (English Electric) TSR.2". X-Planes and Prototypes: From Nazi Secret Weapons to the Warplanes of the Future. London: Amber Books Ltd., 2005. .
 Winchester, Jim. "BAC TSR.2." and "Northrop XB-35/YB-49". Concept Aircraft: Prototypes, X-Planes and Experimental Aircraft. Kent, UK: Grange Books plc., 2005. .
 Wood, Derek. Project Cancelled: The Disaster of Britain's Abandoned Aircraft Projects. London: Jane's, 2nd edition, 1986, First edition 1975. .
 Wynn, Humphrey. The RAF Strategic Nuclear Deterrent Forces: Their Origins, Roles and Deployment, 1946–1969: A Documentary History. London: HMO, 1997.

External links

TSR-2 page on Thunder and Lightnings site
TSR-2 history with images of XR220 on Aviation Elettra site

Cancelled military aircraft projects of the United Kingdom
TSR-2
1960s British bomber aircraft
Twinjets
History of science and technology in the United Kingdom
Aircraft first flown in 1964